Luigi Dino Felisetti (23 September 1919 – 20 October 2021) was an Italian politician. A member of the Italian Socialist Party, he served in the Chamber of Deputies from 1972 to 1987. A long-time lawyer, he was a member of the Higher Council of the Judiciary from 1988 to 1990. As a representative of the Socialist Party, he was councillor for urban planning and deputy mayor of Reggio, provincial secretary of the party, and, beginning in 1972, a deputy for 18 years.

References

1919 births
2021 deaths
Italian centenarians
20th-century Italian judges
Men centenarians
People from Modena
Italian Socialist Party politicians
Deputies of Legislature VI of Italy
Deputies of Legislature VII of Italy
Deputies of Legislature VIII of Italy
Deputies of Legislature IX of Italy